Arthur Paul Dean, Baron Dean of Harptree, PC (14 September 1924 – 1 April 2009) was a British Conservative Party politician.

Early life and Second World War
Paul Dean was born in Northwich, Cheshire, England, on 14 September 1924, and was educated at Ellesmere College and Exeter College, Oxford. He served with the Welsh Guards during the Second World War, being commissioned in that regiment on 28 January 1944, with the service number of 307877. He fought with the regiment's 2nd Battalion, part of the Guards Armoured Division under Major General Allan Adair, in the Battle of Normandy where he was wounded. Shortly after the end of World War II in Europe Dean served in Germany with the British Army of the Rhine (BAOR) as aide-de-camp (ADC) to the General Officer Commanding (GOC) I Corps, initially Lieutenant-General Sir John Crocker and then Lieutenant-General Sidney Kirkman before Lieutenant-General Ivor Thomas took over from September 1945. Dean retired from the army in 1949.

Political career
In 1962 Dean was the Conservative candidate in a by-election for the very safe Labour seat of Pontefract; he was defeated by Joseph Harper.

He was Member of Parliament for North Somerset from 1964 to 1983, and after boundary changes, for Woodspring from 1983 until his retirement in 1992, preceding Liam Fox.  Dean was a junior minister for Health and Social Security during the 1970-1974 Conservative government.  From 1982 until his retirement, he was a Deputy Speaker of the House of Commons firstly under George Thomas and then Bernard Weatherill. He was knighted in the 1985 New Year Honours. When in the chair of the Commons on 21 June 1990, Dean was required to use his casting vote.

House of Lords
On 12 October 1993 he was created a life peer as Baron Dean of Harptree, of Wedmore in the County of Somerset. He served as Deputy Speaker in the House of Lords.

Personal life
Dean was married twice. His first wife, Doris, died in 1979. He married Peggy Dierden in 1980. They lived at Banwell near Weston-super-Mare in Somerset.

References

External links
British Army Officers 1939−1945
Times Guide to the House of Commons 1987

Guardian obituary

1924 births
2009 deaths
British Army personnel of World War II
People educated at Ellesmere College
People from Northwich
Welsh Guards officers
Alumni of Exeter College, Oxford
Presidents of the Oxford University Conservative Association
Conservative Party (UK) MPs for English constituencies
Deputy Speakers of the British House of Commons
UK MPs 1964–1966
UK MPs 1966–1970
UK MPs 1970–1974
UK MPs 1974
UK MPs 1974–1979
UK MPs 1979–1983
UK MPs 1983–1987
UK MPs 1987–1992
Dean of Harptree
Knights Bachelor
Members of the Privy Council of the United Kingdom
Politicians awarded knighthoods
Military personnel from Cheshire
Life peers created by Elizabeth II